Phijigee Mani (English: My Only Jem; also written as  Phijigi Mani) is a 2011 Indian Meitei language film directed by O. Gautam, co-written and produced by Takhelchangbam Ongbi Medha Sharmi, 
under the banner of Radha Govind Films. It stars an ensemble cast including Gurumayum Bonny, Abenao Elangbam and Leishangthem Tonthoingambi Devi. It won the National Film Award for Best Feature Film in Manipuri and Best Supporting Actress (Leishangthem Tonthoingambi Devi) awards at the 59th National Film Awards. Phijigee Mani was also selected for Indian Panorama of  42nd International Film Festival of India 2011.

Phijigee Mani was screened at Habitat Film Festival 2012, New Delhi. It was also screened in the North-East Film Festival 2014 held at Siri Fort Auditorium, New Delhi.

Synopsis
When job, time and situation snatches her only son away from her lap, Sanajaoba's mother longed for her gem to come back. Yaiphabee, Sanajaoba's younger sister, acts as a catalyst to bridge the strained relationship between Sanajaoba and his mother. A slice of the evolving socio-political scenario of Manipur (and the northeast at large) is captured through the lens of Sanajaoba's family.

Cast
 Gurumayum Bonny as Sanajaoba
 Leishangthem Tonthoingambi Devi as Yaiphabee, Sanajaoba's younger sister
 Abenao Elangbam as Bicha
 Y. Kumarjit as Sanajaoba's father
 Hijam Shyamdhani as Yaiphabi's uncle
 Ayekpam Shanti as Sanajaoba's mother
 R.K. Sorojini Devi as Yaiphabi's aunty
 Venus as Yaiphabi's love interest
 Momita as Jessica, Sanajaoba's wife
 Baby Rainy as Langlen, Sanajaoba's daughter

Accolades
Leishangthem Tonthoingambi Devi won the Best Supporting Actress Award at the 59th National Film Awards. The movie also won the National Film Award for Best Feature Film in Manipuri. The citation for the National Award reads, "For a sensitive depiction of the complex displacements that are occurring today in the North Eastern states. The director shows in the most graceful manner the consequences of displaced socio-political priorities which dislodge the young and disturb traditional family moorings and the even more ancient tribal societal systems".

References

External links
 

2010s Meitei-language films
Films featuring a Best Supporting Actress National Film Award-winning performance
2011 films
Cinema of Manipur